The second season of the police procedural drama NCIS was originally broadcast between September 28, 2004, and May 24, 2005, on CBS. This season shifts away from the naval setting of the show somewhat, and includes more character development than the first season.

With the episode "Lt. Jane Doe", the show also introduced the phoofs, a black and white "preview" which was shown at the beginning of each act of that episode and has continued to be used to this day.

Season two had Norfolk Case Agent Timothy McGee being promoted to a full-time field agent, and transferring to NCIS HQ in Washington to work with the Major Case Response Team. Tony DiNozzo nearly died of the pneumonic plague in "SWAK" while the season finale, "Twilight", ended with a shocking and unexpected twist: Caitlin Todd was shot and killed by Ari Haswari.

Cast

Main 
 Mark Harmon as Leroy Jethro Gibbs, NCIS Supervisory Special Agent (SSA) of the Major Case Response Team (MCRT) assigned to Washington's Navy Yard
 Sasha Alexander as Caitlin Todd, NCIS Special Agent
 Michael Weatherly as Anthony DiNozzo, NCIS Senior Special Agent, second in command of MCRT
 Pauley Perrette as Abby Sciuto, Forensic Specialist for NCIS
 Sean Murray as Timothy McGee, NCIS Probationary Special Agent
 David McCallum as Dr. Donald "Ducky" Mallard, Chief Medical Examiner for NCIS

Recurring 
 Alan Dale as Thomas Morrow, NCIS Director
 Alicia Coppola as Faith Coleman, JAG Commander
 Joe Spano as Tobias Fornell, FBI Senior Special Agent
 Jessica Steen as Paula Cassidy, NCIS Senior Special Agent
 Rudolf Martin as Ari Haswari, rogue Mossad Agent
 Brian Dietzen as Jimmy Palmer, Assistant Medical Examiner for NCIS and temporary replacement for Gerald after he gets shot
 Nina Foch as Victoria Mallard, Ducky's mother
 Troian Bellisario as Sarah McGee, Tim McGee's sister
 Tamara Taylor as Cassie Yates, NCIS Special Agent

Episodes

DVD release

References 

General references 
 
 
 

2004 American television seasons
2005 American television seasons
NCIS 02